Jens Wilhelm August Lind (1 March 1874, in Nykøbing Mors – 4 October 1939, in Viborg) was a Danish apothecary, botanist and mycologist. He was a pupil of Emil Rostrup and published a full account of all fungi collected in Denmark by Rostrup. These were mainly microfungi, such as plant pathogens. He also wrote accounts on microfungi from Greenland and elsewhere, mainly based on collections made by other persons on expeditions, e.g. Gjøa expedition
 and the Second Thule Expedition.
Combining his pharmaceutical and mycological knowledge, he was early in experimenting on chemical control of plant pathogens and recommending it to other practitioners.
He also - together with Knud Jessen - wrote an account on the immigration history of weeds to Denmark.

Example of a species named by Lind: Triposporium myrti, now known as Tripospermum myrti (Capnodiaceae).

See also 
Knud Jessen
Knud Rasmussen

References

External links
Jens Lind – Stamtavler for Rosenkilde og Wisborg
Index Fungorum author details

20th-century Danish botanists
Danish mycologists
Danish pharmacists
Botanists active in the Arctic
1874 births
1939 deaths
People from Morsø Municipality